Oleksandr Valeriyovych Yermachenko (born 29 January 1993) is a Ukrainian professional football midfielder.

Career
Yermachenko is a product of FC Dynamo Kyiv Youth Sportive School. His first trainers were Yuriy Yastrebynskyi and Vitaliy Khmelnytskyi.

After playing for Ukrainian clubs in the different levels, with a short time in Moldova, in August 2016 he signed a contract with Georgian club Zugdidi from the Umaglesi Liga.

References

External links
 
 

1993 births
Living people
Ukrainian footballers
Ukraine student international footballers
Ukraine youth international footballers
FC Skala Stryi (2004) players
FC Dynamo-2 Kyiv players
FC Stal Kamianske players
PFC Sumy players
CSF Bălți players
FC Zugdidi players
FC Aktobe players
FC Arsenal Kyiv players
FC Kremin Kremenchuk players
Speranța Nisporeni players
FC Karpaty Lviv players
Ukrainian expatriate footballers
Expatriate footballers in Moldova
Expatriate footballers in Georgia (country)
Expatriate footballers in Kazakhstan
Expatriate footballers in the Czech Republic
Ukrainian expatriate sportspeople in Moldova
Ukrainian expatriate sportspeople in Georgia (country)
Ukrainian expatriate sportspeople in Kazakhstan
Ukrainian expatriate sportspeople in the Czech Republic
Association football forwards
Ukrainian Premier League players
Ukrainian First League players
Ukrainian Second League players
Moldovan Super Liga players
Erovnuli Liga players
Erovnuli Liga 2 players
Kazakhstan Premier League players
Sportspeople from Zakarpattia Oblast